Kowl Darrah or Kowl Darreh  is a village in Khwahan  of  Badakhshan Province in north-eastern Afghanistan.

References

External links
Kōl Ḏaṟṟah37°55'25" N, 70°14'39" E:Kol Darrah,Khwahan.maps

Populated places in Khwahan District